Michaela Čulová is a retired Czech football defender.

She was a member of the Czech national team. She made her debut for the national team on 3 June 2011 in a match against Nigeria.

Career honours

Club
SV Neulengbach
ÖFB-Frauenliga (1): 2013-14

Bohemians Prague
Czech Second Division (1): 2012-13

Sparta Prague
Czech First Division (5): 2007–08, 2008–09 Czech  2009–10, 2010–11, 2011–12
Czech Women's Cup (6): 2007–08, 2008–09, 2009–10, 2010–11, 2011–12, 2014–15

FK Teplice
Czech Second Division (1): 2004-05

References

1991 births
Living people
Czech women's footballers
Czech Republic women's international footballers
SV Neulengbach (women) players
Expatriate women's footballers in Austria
Czech expatriate sportspeople in Austria
Czech expatriate women's footballers
People from Most District
Women's association football defenders
FK Bohemians Prague (Střížkov) players
AC Sparta Praha (women) players
ÖFB-Frauenliga players
Czech Women's First League players
Sportspeople from the Ústí nad Labem Region